The 1987–88 Roller Hockey Champions Cup was the 24th edition of the Roller Hockey Champions Cup organized by CERH.

Liceo achieved their second consecutive title.

Teams
The champions of the main European leagues played this competition, consisting in a double-legged knockout tournament. As Spanish league champions Liceo qualified as title holder, Barcelona was also admitted as the Spanish representative.

Bracket

Source:

References

External links
 CERH website

1988 in roller hockey
1987 in roller hockey
Rink Hockey Euroleague